Chirayinkeezhu is a town in Thiruvananthapuram district in the Indian state of Kerala. It was also hometown of famous Malayalam Film actor Prem Nazir . It is the seat of Chirayinkeezhu taluk.

Anjengo Fort
The well known Anjengo Fort (Anchutengu kotta) is on the way from Chirayinkil to Varkala via Kadakkavoor. Old Portuguese-style churches, the lighthouse, a 100-year-old convent and school, tombs of Dutch and British sailors and soldiers, and the remains of the fort are major points of interest here. Anchuthengu has a beautiful and clean beach. Kaikara village, the birthplace of the famous Malayalam poet Kumaran Asan, is located nearby. In the past, post arrived through the Trivandrum-Cochin Canal at Anchal Kadavu to Pulimootil Kadavu Post Office.

Transport
The nearest airport is Thiruvananthapuram International Airport. Chirayinkeezhu railway station is the nearest railway station. There are frequent regular private bus services connecting with Attingal, Kadakkavur and Varkala. Kerala Road Transport Corporation (KSRTC) operates daily bus services from Thiruvananthapuram, Perumathura and Pothencode amongst others.

Six express trains and all passing passenger trains stop at Chirayinkil railway station. It is on the Thriuvananthapuram-Kollam rail route. The Malabar Express, Guruvayoor-Chennai Egmore Express, Vanchinad Express, Venad Express and Thiruvananthapuram-Kannur Express all pass through this station. Traveling south, Thiruvananthapuram Central Railway Station is the nearest major railhead. To the north, Kollam Junction railway station is the nearest main station.

State Government Offices
 Chirayinkeezhu, Sub Registrar Office
 PWD, Buildings Section
 LSGD Office
 Panchayath Office
 Excise office
 Taluk Hospital

See also 
Poothura

References

Villages in Thiruvananthapuram district